Ansah might refer to:

Surname
Andy Ansah (born 1969), English footballer
Akwasi Owusu-Ansah (born 1988), American football player
Aziz Ansah (born 1980), Ghanaian footballer
Edmund Owusu-Ansah (born 1983), Ghanaian footballer
Ezekiel Ansah (born 1989), American football player
James Owusu-Ansah (born 1981), Ghanaian footballer
Joey Ansah (born 1982), English actor and martial artist
Kwaw Ansah (born 1982), Ghanaian film director
Maxwell Ansah better known as Lethal Bizzle (born 1984), English musician
Michael Paul Ansah (born 1928), Ghanaian politician; member of parliament during the first republic and minister of state during the third republic
Timothy Ansah (1919–2008), Ghanaian politician; member of parliament during the first republic
Owusu-Ansah Kontoh (born 1992), Ghanaian footballer
Princeton Owusu-Ansah (born 1976), Ghanaian footballer
Sandra Owusu-Ansah (born 2000), Ghanaian professional footballer
William Ansah Sessarakoo (1736–1749), Ghanaian businessman
Zak Ansah (born 1994), English football player

Given name
Ansah Owusu (born 1979), English footballer

See also
 Ansa (disambiguation)
 Anza (disambiguation)

Surnames of Akan origin